Ronald Griffiths is an Australian professional rugby league football coach who is the head coach of the Newcastle Knights NRL Women's Premiership team.

Background
Griffiths is of Indigenous Australian descent. He played junior rugby league for the Woodberry Warriors.

Coaching career

Early years
In 2012, Griffiths coached the Maitland Pickers in the Newcastle Rugby League, as well as mentoring the under-16s New South Wales Koori side. In 2014, he coached the Greta-Branxton Colts as well as being a pathways coach with the New South Wales VB Cup representative side. In 2016, he became head coach at the Kurri Kurri Bulldogs. In 2019, he worked with the coaching staff at the Wests Tigers, before taking up an assistant coach role with the team in 2020. In 2021, he was a part of the coaching staff for the Indigenous All Stars side.

2022
In April 2022, Griffiths was announced as the head coach of the Newcastle Knights' NRLW team. The team won 4 of its 5 regular season games, before winning the semi final match and ultimately winning the 2022 NRLW Premiership, the Knights' defeating the Parramatta Eels 32-12.

References

External links
Newcastle Knights profile

Living people
Australian rugby league coaches
Indigenous All Stars coaches
Indigenous Australian sportspeople
Newcastle Knights (NRLW) coaches
Year of birth missing (living people)